Ethan Wiley is an American screenwriter, film producer, director and musician.

Wiley wrote the screenplay for the 1986 film House and has written and directed several other horror films, including, House II: The Second Story, Children of the Corn V: Fields of Terror, starring David Carradine and Eva Mendes, Blackwater Valley Exorcism and Brutal, starring Jeffrey Combs, Michael Berryman and Sarah Thompson.  In 2006, Wiley formed Wiseacre Films, an independent production company.  Producing credits include Blackwater Valley Exorcism, A Dead Calling, Drifter, Brutal, Deadwater (a.k.a. Black Ops), Bear and The Butterfly Room.  Ethan was the co-writer, director and producer of the family comedy movie Elf-Man and the Chinese action-adventure feature Journey to the Forbidden Valley. Ethan was a Production Consultant for the Universal Pictures action film The Man with the Iron Fists 2, and teleplay writer for Universal's Dead Again in Tombstone.

Earlier in his career, Wiley worked as a special effects artist and puppeteer on Return of the Jedi,  Gremlins and Romancing the Stone.

Music career
Wiley is a mandolin and mandocello player. He composed and produced the instrumental CD, Take A Stand, featuring Jon Sholle (guitar), Joe Craven (percussion), Jim Whitney (bass) and Joyce Andersen (violin). Ethan composed and performed two songs for the soundtrack of Jason X, has contributed mandolin, mandocello and guitar to other feature film soundtracks, and has performed and recorded with various singer-songwriters, including Robert Morgan Fisher, Jeff Geoffray, Kevin Meade and Coale Johnson.

In 2021, Wiley debuted the Virtuosity Podcast on Spotify, YouTube and Patreon, with musician Timo Shanko, exploring the world of musical virtuosity.

Partial filmography
Return of the Jedi
Gremlins
House
House II: The Second Story
Children of the Corn V: Fields of Terror
Blackwater Valley Exorcism
Brutal
Deadwater
Bear
The Butterfly Room
Elf-Man
The Man with the Iron Fists 2
Dead Again in Tombstone

References

External links
 
 Mean Bunny, Inc. Official website for Ethan Wiley
  Ethan Wiley Music CD "Take a Stand"
 Virtuosity Podcast on Spotify

Year of birth missing (living people)
Living people
American film directors
American male screenwriters
American record producers